Heinrich Husmann (December 16, 1908 Cologne, Germany − November 8, 1983 Brussels) was a German musicologist and university professor.

Biography 

At the University of Göttingen, Husmann was a pupil of Friedrich Ludwig and then of Johannes Wolf, Arnold Schering, Friedrich Blume and Erich Moritz von Hornbostel at the Humboldt University, Berlin, where he received his doctorate in 1932.

His first position was as an assistant lecturer at the musicological institute at the University of Leipzig, completing his Habilitation in 1941, becoming acting director in 1944. While there he was responsible for the collection of musical instruments in the Grassi Museum. In 1948 he completed a second Habilitation at the University of Hamburg, organising its musicological institute in 1949.

List of selected works

References

Bibliography

External links 
 Musikinstrumentensammlung der Universität Göttingen

German musicologists